Aflex is an unincorporated community and coal town in Pike County, Kentucky, United States.

History
A post office called Aflex was established in 1916, and remained in operation until 1988. The community derives its name from A. F. Leckie, a businessperson in the coal-mining industry.

References

Unincorporated communities in Pike County, Kentucky
Unincorporated communities in Kentucky
Coal towns in Kentucky